Ey, güzel Qırım is a famous Crimean Tatar folk song. Its melody is universally recognized among Crimean Tatars, and is frequently played in Crimean Tatar concerts. The sorrowful lyrics mourn a life of exile and grieve over the loss of a beloved homeland. The origin of the song is unclear, but it is believed that it was composed anonymously sometime after the deportation of the Crimean Tatars. However, there are unconfirmed allegations that it was written during a visit to Alushta in 1968 by Fatma Halilova and Shurki Osmanov - Crimean Tatars who were exiled to Andijan. A small portion of the song that did not contain the word "Crimea" was incorporated into Jamala's song "1944" when she represented Ukraine in the Eurovision Song Contest 2016 and won.

Lyrics

Original version

Translation 
Winds that blow in Alushta, 
Hit my face, 
Filling my eyes with tears 
In the land of my fathers 

I could not live in this land,
I could not enjoy my youth,
I'm longing for my homeland,
Oh, beautiful Crimea!

Fruits of the garden, 
Are like honey and sherbet, 
No matter how much I drink its waters, 
It's not enough for me. 

Kids will say homeland, 
Immediately tears pour, 
Old men stretch out their hands 
And send all their prayers.

References 

Crimean Tatar music
Crimean Tatar-language songs